Alioune Diakhate (born 10 April 1994) is a Senegalese professional footballer who plays forward for Albion San Diego in the National Independent Soccer Association.

Career
Diakhate signed with FC Tucson on September 23, 2021.

On 31 March 2022, Albion San Diego of the National Independent Soccer Association announced that they signed Diakhate ahead of their 2022 season.

References

External links
  

1994 births
Living people
Senegalese footballers
Indy Eleven players
FC Tucson players
USL Championship players
USL League One players
National Independent Soccer Association players
Senegalese expatriate footballers
Expatriate soccer players in the United States
Association football forwards